Zeise's salt, potassium trichloro(ethylene)platinate(II) hydrate, is the chemical compound with the formula K[PtCl3(C2H4)]·H2O.  The anion of this air-stable, yellow, coordination complex contains an η2-ethylene ligand. The anion features a  platinum atom with a square planar geometry.  The salt is of historical importance in the area of organometallic chemistry as one of the first examples of a transition metal alkene complex and is named for its discoverer, William Christopher Zeise.

Preparation
This compound is commercially available as a hydrate. The hydrate is commonly prepared from K2[PtCl4] and ethylene in the presence of a catalytic amount of SnCl2. The water of hydration can be removed in vacuo.

Structure
The alkene C=C bond is approximately perpendicular to the PtCl3 plane. In Zeise's salt and related compounds, the alkene rotates about the metal-alkene bond with a modest activation energy.  Analysis of the barrier heights indicates that the π-bonding between most metals and the alkene is weaker than the σ-bonding.  In Zeise's anion, this rotational barrier has not been assessed.

History
Zeise's salt was one of the first organometallic compounds to be reported. It was discovered by William Christopher Zeise, a professor at the University of Copenhagen, who prepared this compound in 1830 while investigating the reaction of PtCl4 with boiling ethanol. Following careful analysis he proposed that the resulting compound contained ethylene.  Justus von Liebig, a highly influential chemist of that era, often criticised Zeise's proposal, but Zeise's proposal was decisively supported in 1868 when Birnbaum prepared the complex using ethylene. Zeise's salt received a great deal of attention during the second half of the 19th century because chemists could not explain its molecular structure. This question remained unanswered until the determination of its X-ray crystal structure in the 20th century.  Zeise's salt stimulated much scientific research in the field of organometallic chemistry and would be key in defining new concepts in chemistry. The Dewar–Chatt–Duncanson model explains how the metal is coordinated to the C=C double bond.

Related compounds
 Zeise's dimer, [(η2-C2H4)PtCl2]2, derived from Zeise's salt by elimination of KCl followed by dimerisation.
 COD-platinum dichloride, (cyclooctadiene)PtCl2, derived from platinum(II) chloride and 1,5-cyclooctadiene, is a common platinum(II) alkene complex.
Many other ethylene complexes have been prepared. For example, ethylenebis(triphenylphosphine)platinum(0), [(C6H5)3P]2Pt(H2C=CH2), wherein the platinum is three-coordinate and in oxidation state 0 (Zeise's salt is a derivative of platinum(II)).
 Dichloro(ethylene)(α-methylbenzylamine)platinum(II) (PtCl2(C2H4)(PhCH(NH2)Me) is a chiral derivative of Zeise's salt that is used for the optical resolution of alkenes.

References

Organoplatinum compounds
Alkene complexes
Chlorides
Chloro complexes